Al-Anbuh al-A'la is a sub-district located in the Al-Ma'afer District, Taiz Governorate, Yemen. Al-Anbuh al-A'la had a population of 3,171 according to the 2004 census.

References  

Sub-districts in Al-Ma'afer District